The Siemens E40 AG-V1 is a type of electric locomotive built by Siemens Mobility for use in Queensland, Australia.

History
The design is based on the Queensland Railways 3700 class electric locomotive, rebuilt by UGL Rail from older locomotives using Siemens components. The engine room layout is similar to the 3700 class and the majority of the electrical components are identical. All are used on trains on the Queensland coal network.

By operator

Aurizon
In March 2006, Queensland Rail awarded a contract for the supply of 20 Class 3800 narrow gauge electric locomotives. In August 2007, the order was increased to 45. In July 2010, these passed into the ownership of QR National.

Pacific National
Pacific National ordered 23 units in 2008 with the first delivered in February 2009. In July 2010, the order was increased to 32.

BHP Mitsubishi Alliance
The BHP Mitsubishi Alliance ordered 13 locomotives in July 2012. As at February 2014, seven had been delivered. They will be used in the Bowen Basin.

Summary

References

External links
 E40 AG-V1 picture gallery

Aurizon electric locomotives
BHP Billiton electric locomotives
Electric locomotives of Queensland
Pacific National electric locomotives
Queensland Rail locomotives
Siemens locomotives
25 kV AC locomotives
3 ft 6 in gauge locomotives of Australia
Freight locomotives
Bo-Bo-Bo locomotives